Brasileira (Brazilian) may refer to:

Brasileira, Piauí, municipality in the state of Piauí in the Northeast region of Brazil
Café A Brasileira, café in the civil parish of Sacramento, Lisbon, Portugal
Café A Brasileira (Braga), café in the civil parish of Braga, Portugal
Linhas Aéreas Brasileiras, Brazilian airline founded in 1945
Linha Aérea Transcontinental Brasileira, Brazilian airline formed in 1944
Música popular brasileira, Brazilian pop music, a trend in post-bossa nova urban popular music in Brazil